Harpalus polyglyptus is a species of ground beetle in the subfamily Harpalinae. It was described by Schaum in 1862.

References

polyglyptus
Beetles described in 1862
Taxa named by Hermann Rudolph Schaum